Pietro Andrea Ziani (1616 in Venice 1684 in Naples) was an Italian organist and composer. He was the uncle of Marc'Antonio Ziani. Beginning in 1669, he was the organist at St Mark's Basilica and later moved on to serve Eleonor Magdalene of Neuburg in Vienna. His works included "L'Assalone punito" (1667) and the operas "La ricreazione burlesca" (1663), "L'invidia conculcata della virtù, merito, virtù, merito, valore di Leopoldo imperatore" (1664), "Cloridea" (1665), "Circe" (1665), "L'Elice" (1666) and "La Galatea" (1667).

Recordings
 "L'Assalone punito"  Il Complesso Barocco, Alan Curtis. Symphonia 2001.

References

1616 births
1684 deaths
Italian Baroque composers
Italian male classical composers
17th-century Italian composers
17th-century male musicians